Rakesh Sharma (born 2 July 1958) is the Managing Director & Chief Executive Officer of IDBI Bank. He is one of the first two private bankers to lead a state-run bank. Previously, Sharma was the MD and CEO of Lakshmi Vilas Bank and Canara Bank. He has also held several key positions at State Bank of India during his 33-year tenure with the lender. He is a seasoned banker with over three decades of experience primarily in retail and wholesale banking, corporate credit, asset liability management, loan syndication, industrial relations and human resources.

Career

State Bank of India 
Sharma started his career with State Bank of India (SBI) as a probationary officer in 1980 and served the bank till 2014. His last position in SBI was that of Chief General Manager for Patna Circle, comprising Bihar and Jharkhand. Sharma has also held portfolios including lending to mid-corporate accounts in Andhra Pradesh region and supervising retail operations in the states of Rajasthan, Uttarakhand and Western UP. Earlier, he served as Chief Executive Officer of SBI Japan where he steered and directed operations of SBI branches in Tokyo and Osaka.

Lakshmi Vilas Bank 
Sharma joined Lakshmi Vilas Bank (LVB) as the MD and CEO in March 2014. He helmed Lakshmi Vilas Bank's rapid growth, as well as internal governance and mobile banking. During his 18-month tenure, the bank raised Rs. 406 crores through rights issue, which improved the capital adequacy ratio to 14.6%, providing sufficient capital for further business growth.

Canara Bank 
Sharma joined Canara Bank in September 2015 as part of Government of India's Mission Indradhanush to revive public sector banks. He has led an extensive reorganisation drive at the bank moving from a three-tier to a four-tier organisation structure – comprising head office, 21 circles, 118 regional offices (ROs) and 5,847 branches across the country. Sharma believes that Indian PSBs must be more agile to efficiently cater their services to the customers and bring in sustained growth by establishing more customer-friendly initiatives.

At Canara Bank, he has largely focused on reorienting and strengthening the balance sheet by augmenting retail business, digitalisation and transformation. Sharma has raised capital for the bank through stake sales and by monetising the bank's investments in its subsidiaries such as Can Fin Homes.

Additional positions held 
 Sharma is the Non-Executive Chairman of Canara Bank Securities Ltd. (CBSL)
 Non-Executive Chairman of Canbank Computer Services Limited (CCSL)
 Non-Executive Chairman of Canbank Factors Ltd.
 Associate Director of Canara Robeco Asset Management Company Ltd.
 Director of Canbank Venture Capital Fund Ltd (CVCFL)
 Chairman of the Sub-Committee of the Indian Banks’ Association representing 11th Bipartite settlement for Wage Revision
 Chairman of the Working Group on Credit Growth for Gyan Sangam
 Member of the Governing Council of Indian Institute of Banking & Finance
 Member of the Governing Board of Institute of Banking Personnel Selection
 Member of the Managing Committee of the Indian Banks’ Association

Awards received 
Sharma received National Award for Excellence in lending to MSME, Micro Enterprises and PMEGP conferred on Canara Bank and presented by Hon’ble Prime Minister Shri Narendra Modi in 2016.

References 

1958 births
Living people
Indian bankers
Indian chief executives